Robert Francis Klaus (born December 27, 1937), is a former right-handed Major League Baseball infielder who played from 1964 to 1965 for the Cincinnati Reds and New York Mets. He is the brother of the late MLB infielder Billy Klaus.

Prior to playing professional baseball, Klaus attended University of Illinois at Urbana–Champaign.

Originally signed as an amateur free agent by the Cincinnati Redlegs in 1959, Klaus made his big league debut on April 21, 1964, against Jimmy Wynn and the rest of the Houston Colt .45s as a pinch hitter for pitcher Jim O'Toole. He did not get an official at-bat in his first game, because a runner on base was caught trying to advance.

Klaus did poorly as a brief replacement for Pete Rose in 1964 with the Reds, batting .183 in 40 games. He was purchased by the Mets on July 19 of that year, and with them he played in 56 games, compiling a .244 batting average. Overall, in 96 games in his rookie season, he batted .225.

1965 would end up being Klaus' final season in the big leagues. In 119 games with the Mets, he collected 55 hits in 288 at-bats for a .191 batting average. He showed a fair eye at the plate, with his walk total nearly matching his strikeout total – he had 45 and 49 respectively.

He played his final big league game on October 3, 1965, against the Philadelphia Phillies. He ended his career on a sour note – he collected no hits in five at bats in his final game.

In his big league career, he played in 215 total games, collecting 123 hits in 590 at-bats for a .208 batting average. He hit 25 doubles, four triples and six home runs, scored 65 runs and drove 29 in, stole five bases and was caught 10 times, and walked 74 times and struck out 92 times. He committed 21 errors in the field for a .973 fielding percentage.

Statistically, he is most similar to Buddy Biancalana.

Although his big league career ended after the 1965 season, he still stuck around in pro baseball for a while, and was part of some notable transactions. On February 22, 1966, he was traded by the Mets with Wayne Graham and Jimmie Schaffer to the Phillies for Dick Stuart.

On December 2, 1968, he was drafted by the San Diego Padres from the Phillies in the rule 5 draft.

Finally, on March 28, 1969, he was traded by the Padres with Ron Davis to the Pittsburgh Pirates for Tommie Sisk and Chris Cannizzaro.

External links

1937 births
Living people
Baseball players from Illinois
Cincinnati Reds players
Columbia Reds players
Columbus Jets players
Major League Baseball infielders
Nashville Vols players
New York Mets players
People from Spring Grove, Illinois
San Diego Padres (minor league) players
Topeka Hawks players